McClintock Peak is located in the Lewis Range, Glacier National Park in the U.S. state of Montana. McClintock Peak is situated along the Continental Divide.

Geology 

Like other mountains in Glacier National Park, the mountain is composed of sedimentary rock laid down during the Precambrian to Jurassic periods.

Climate 
According to the Köppen climate classification system, the mountain is located in an alpine subarctic climate zone with long, cold, snowy winters, and cool to warm summers. Winter temperatures can drop below −10 °F with wind chill factors below −30 °F. Due to its altitude, it receives precipitation all year, as snow in winter, and as thunderstorms in summer.

See also
 Mountains and mountain ranges of Glacier National Park (U.S.)

References

External links
 Walter McClintock lantern slides: Wikimedia
 Walter McClintock photo: Wikimedia

McClintock Peak
Mountains of Glacier National Park (U.S.)
Lewis Range
Mountains of Montana